"Hey Venus" is a 1990 single by That Petrol Emotion.

Track listing

Credits 
 Produced by Scott Litt
 "Hey Venus" remixes by Kevin Armstrong, Steve Mack & Hugo Nicolson
 "Groove Check (Check This Groove Out)" produced by Roli Mosimann, remix & re-arrangement by Ben Aguiar, guitar solo & samples by Bill Cruz
 "Sensitise (Sensi Mix)" remixed by Kevin Armstrong & Hugo Nicolson
 "Light & Shade" produced by Steve Mack & That Petrol Emotion

References

1990 songs
That Petrol Emotion songs
Song recordings produced by Scott Litt
Virgin Records singles